Kirk Allen (born 1918) was the pseudonym given to a patient of Robert M. Lindner's, in his book The Fifty-Minute Hour.  Born in Hawaii, "Allen" soon became obsessed with a series of novels, the protagonist of which shared his name.  Due to "Allen"'s anonymity, it is unclear what the series was, apart from the fact that it was science fiction.  Some have theorized that the series was the Barsoom books, by Edgar Rice Burroughs, featuring the main character John Carter.

"Allen" attended university, and became a scientist, working with the United States Military on a classified research project during World War II, which helped to bring about the war's end. Meanwhile, convinced that the novels were his personal biography, he "filled in" many omitted details from the novels, from his own "recollection". He was incredibly thorough, creating full-color maps, sketches, a glossary of names and terms, socio-economic data, et cetera. In his own words:My first effort, then, was to remember. I started by fixing in my mind, and later on paper in the forms of maps, genealogical tables, and so on, what the author of my biography had put down. When I had this mastered, by remembering I was able to correct his errors, fill in many details, and close gaps between one volume of the biography and the next.

Eventually, he reached the outer limits of the scope of the novels, and began to "recall" his/the character's further adventures. He even began to hallucinate being in the various settings of his stories, physically experiencing them. Soon, his employers became aware of his psychotic condition, and demanded that he get psychiatric treatment.  Reluctantly, he conceded.  His psychoanalyst was Lindner, who would eventually write a popular case-study of Allen. Lindner eventually cured Allen, by immersing himself in the fantasy world, but in the process became himself obsessed.

Paul Linebarger (better known by his nom de plume, Cordwainer Smith) was long rumored to have been the original "Kirk Allen". According to Cordwainer Smith scholar Alan C. Elms, this  speculation first reached print in Brian Aldiss's 1973 history of science fiction, Billion Year Spree; Aldiss, in turn, claimed to have received the information from Leon Stover. More recently, both Elms and librarian Lee Weinstein have gathered circumstantial evidence to support the case for Linebarger's being "Allen", but both concede there is no direct proof that Linebarger was ever a patient of Lindner's or that he suffered from a disorder similar to that of "Allen". Although no direct link between Linebarger and Lindner has been proven, personalities in the science fiction world whom Lindner is known to have been personally acquainted with include Theodore Sturgeon, who was in psychoanalysis with an analyst recommended to him by Lindner, and Philip Wylie, the author of When Worlds Collide and Gladiator, whom Lindner psychoanalyzed in 1952.

Physicist Saul-Paul Sirag has theorized that Allen was really a research physicist named Francis Burton "Kiko" Harrison II, son of American politician and diplomat Francis Burton Harrison, citing areas of biographical similarity as well as a few possible instances of deliberate obfuscation.

In popular culture
In 2011, Stan Lee created the comic book series Starborn, based on Allen's story. Carl Sagan wrote about this case in Chapter  10 of his book The Demon-Haunted World: Science as a Candle in the Dark, Ballantine Books, March 1996. Jacques Vallee wrote about the case in his book Revelations: Alien Contact and Human Deception, comparing it to the Ummo phenomenon. Thierry Smolderen & Alexandre Clérisse's graphic novel Atomic Empire depicts Allen's story, identifying Allen with Cordwainer Smith.

References

1918 births
Possibly living people
20th-century pseudonymous writers
American science fiction writers
Writers from Hawaii